"You Got It" is a song from American singer Roy Orbison's 22nd studio album, Mystery Girl (1989). The song was released posthumously on January 3, 1989, after Orbison's death from a heart attack on December 6, 1988. The song was issued with "The Only One" as the B-side and was later released with "Crying" (version with k.d. lang). The single reached number nine on the US Billboard Hot 100 and number one on the Adult Contemporary chart, returning Orbison to the top 10 for the first time in 25 years. "You Got It" also reached number three on the UK Singles Chart in early 1989. Although it is an Orbison solo single, Orbison's fellow Traveling Wilburys bandmates, Tom Petty and Jeff Lynne, co-wrote the song and played instruments on the record.

According to The Authorized Roy Orbison, the song was recorded at guitarist Mike Campbell's garage in Los Angeles, California, and mixed at George Harrison's residence Friar Park in Henley-on-Thames, England. Orbison gave his only public rendition of the hit at the Diamond Awards Festival in Antwerp, Belgium, on November 19, 1988, just 17 days before his death and before the single was released. This footage was incorporated into the song's music video. A 2014 version incorporated videos of rehearsal and practice sessions.

Background
"You Got It" was written by Orbison and his Traveling Wilburys bandmates Jeff Lynne and Tom Petty. Their first songwriting collaboration, it was written during the Christmas season of 1987 and recorded in Mike Campbell's garage in Los Angeles, California, in April 1988. Lynne, Petty and Phil Jones provided other instrumentation and background vocals.

Cash Box said that it "showcases Orbison’s distinctive vocal charge—fluid, yet capable of creating excitement" and said "listen for the exotically melodic lift to the chorus".

Personnel
 Roy Orbison – lead vocals and backing vocals, acoustic guitar
 Jeff Lynne – electric guitar, bass, synthesizer, piano and backing vocals
 Tom Petty – acoustic guitar and backing vocals
 Phil Jones – drums and timbals
 Michael Utley – string arrangement

Charts

Weekly charts

Year-end charts

Certifications

Bonnie Raitt version

The song became a hit again in 1995 for Bonnie Raitt, who recorded a version for the soundtrack of the film Boys on the Side. In the United States, it peaked at number 33 on the Billboard Hot 100, and spent two weeks at number 31 on the Cash Box Top 100. In Canada, "You Got It" peaked at number 11 and was the 62nd-biggest hit of 1995.

Charts

Weekly charts

Year-end charts

References

External links
 In-depth Song Analysis at the Jeff Lynne Song Database (jefflynnesongs.com)
 

1989 singles
1989 songs
1995 singles
Arista Records singles
Bonnie Raitt songs
Roy Orbison songs
Song recordings produced by Don Was
Song recordings produced by Jeff Lynne
Songs released posthumously
Songs written by Jeff Lynne
Songs written by Roy Orbison
Songs written by Tom Petty
Virgin Records singles